Capsanthin/capsorubin synthase (CCS, ketoxanthophyll synthase, capsanthin-capsorubin synthase) is an enzyme with systematic name violaxanthin—capsorubin isomerase (ketone-forming). This enzyme catalyses the following chemical reaction

 (1) violaxanthin  capsorubin
 (2) antheraxanthin  capsanthin

This multifunctional enzyme is induced during chromoplast differentiation in plants.

References

External links 
 

EC 5.3.99